The Bengal Nagpur Railway class N Garratt was a class of steam locomotives built by Beyer, Peacock & Company in Engand in 1929. At the time of their construction, they had the largest water capacity of any Garratt, in addition to being the largest locomotives in India. With the success of HSG, this class followed. Due to their heavy weight, they were restricted to 90 lb/yard rails. They had straight-ported cylinders. It is not known if this suited them for hauling slow, heavy coal traffic. Like HSG, they were used Chakradharpur-Jharsuguda and also at Anara-Tatanagar sections. After electrification, they were used at Rourkela. They could haul 2400 tonnes on a 1 in 100 gradient.

In 2006 Locomotive 811 at Kharagpur workshop was reactivated and used on a few runs before being stored again. In order to activate the locomotive, many parts were borrowed from locomotive 815 at the Delhi Railway Museum. The parts were later returned and refitted to 815 which itself was given a cosmetic overhaul. In 2018 a second attempt to activate 811 was made. This time all missing parts were fabricated in a US$400,000 refurbishment that was put out to public tender. The locomotive has made just one trial trip up to the end of 2019.

Technical specifications

See also

Indian Railways
Rail transport in India#History
Locomotives of India
Rail transport in India

References

Railway locomotives introduced in 1929
5 ft 6 in gauge locomotives
Steam locomotives of India
Beyer, Peacock locomotives
Garratt locomotives
4-8-0+0-8-4 locomotives
Articulated locomotives